Kaçanik i Vjetër is a village in the municipality of Kaçanik, Kosovo. It is located north of Kaçanik.

Notes

References

Villages in Kaçanik